Hillyfields or Hilly Fields may refer to:

Places
 Hilly Fields, Colchester, a local nature reserve in Colchester, England
 Hilly Fields, Lewisham, a park in Lewisham, England
 Hilly Fields, a park in Enfield, England
 Hillyfields, Derbyshire, part of the village of North Wingfield, Derbyshire, England
 Hillyfields, Hampshire, a suburb of Southampton, England

Other uses
 "Hilly Fields", a 1982 song by Nick Nicely

See also

 , including Hillyfields
 , including Hilly Fields
 Hillfield (disambiguation), including Hill Field(s)
 Hill (disambiguation)
 Hilly (disambiguation)
 Hilly Flanks, areas around the Fertile Crescent
 Field (disambiguation)
 Fields (disambiguation)